Below is a chronological list of temples of the Church of Jesus Christ of Latter-day Saints (LDS Church) with sortable columns. In the LDS Church, a temple is a building dedicated to be a House of the Lord, and considered by church members to be the most sacred structures on earth. Upon completion, temples are usually open to the public for a short period of time (an "open house"), and then each is dedicated as a "House of the Lord," after which only members in good standing are permitted to enter. Thus, they are not churches or meetinghouses, but rather specialized places of worship.  Within temples, members of the church make covenants, receive instructions, and perform rituals and ordinances. Additionally, members consider the temple a place to commune with God, seek God's aid, understand God's will, and receive personal revelation.

The sortable columns used in this list allow easy comparisons of the different facts and features of each temple. For a list that includes pictures see this list of temples. There is also a list by geographic region with maps.

List of temples
Note: Numbering of temples announced or under construction is tentative pending the dedication of the temple.

Location and Statistics
The following table is a comparison table listing location and statistics for each temple.

Milestones and Design
The following table is a comparison table listing significant milestones for each temple and their design characteristics. The person officiating in each milestone and design is also listed.

Rededications
The following table temples that has been rededicated since their original dedication. The corresponding open house as well as the person officiating in each dedication is also listed.

See also

 Temple (Latter Day Saints)
 Temple (LDS Church)
 List of temples of The Church of Jesus Christ of Latter-day Saints
 List of temples of The Church of Jesus Christ of Latter-day Saints by geographic region
 Temple architecture (LDS Church)
 :Category:Temples (LDS Church)
 List of buildings

Footnotes

References
 2013 Deseret News Church Almanac (2012). Salt Lake City: Deseret News.
 Hawkins, Chad. The First 100 Temples (2001).  Salt Lake City: Deseret Book Company.

External links
 Official Church Temples Site
 Purpose of Temples
 Temples and Family History
 List of leaders who dedicated each temple

Temples of The Church of Jesus Christ of Latter-day Saints

Latter Day Saint movement lists